Nikola Kozlevo is a village in northeastern Bulgaria, part of Shumen Province. It is the administrative centre of Nikola Kozlevo Municipality, which lies in the northeastern part of Shumen Province, in the geographic region of Ludogorie. The village was named after the Bulgarian National Revival revolutionary and writer Nikola Kozlev (1824–1902).

Population
According to the 2011 census, the village of Nikola Kozlevo has 802 inhabitants. The village has a mixed population. With 61% of its population, Bulgarians constitute the largest ethnic group. Romani people constitute 17% of the population, while ethnic  Turks constitute 11%. Main religions are Orthodox Christianity and to a lesser extent Islam.

External links
 Nikola Kozlevo municipality website 

Villages in Shumen Province